The following is a list of the 725 communes of the Moselle department of France.

The communes cooperate in the following intercommunalities (as of 2020):
Metz Métropole
Communauté d'agglomération de Forbach Porte de France
Communauté d'agglomération Portes de France-Thionville
Communauté d'agglomération Saint-Avold Synergie
Communauté d'agglomération Sarreguemines Confluences (partly)
Communauté d'agglomération du Val de Fensch
Communauté de communes de l'Arc Mosellan
Communauté de communes Bouzonvillois - Trois Frontières
Communauté de communes de Cattenom et environs
Communauté de communes du District Urbain de Faulquemont
Communauté de communes de Freyming-Merlebach
Communauté de communes Haut Chemin - Pays de Pange
Communauté de communes de la Houve et du Pays Boulageois
Communauté de communes Mad et Moselle (partly)
Communauté de communes du Pays de Bitche
Communauté de communes du Pays Haut Val d'Alzette (partly)
Communauté de communes du Pays Orne-Moselle
Communauté de communes du Pays de Phalsbourg
Communauté de communes Rives de Moselle
Communauté de communes de Sarrebourg - Moselle Sud
Communauté de communes du Saulnois
Communauté de communes du Sud Messin
Communauté de communes du Warndt

References

Moselle